The Church of Santa María de Loreto de Achao is a Roman Catholic church located in Quinchao Island's largest town, Achao. Often referred to as «Church of Achao» ——, is within the Diocese of Ancud, and was built around 1740 when Chiloé Archipelago was still a part of the Spanish Crown possessions.

The Achao church is one of the oldest traditional Chiloé churches built in the 18th and 19th centuries, and survives almost intact from de Jesuit mission era. It belongs to a group of 16 iconic wooden churches that were declared as a World Heritage site under «Churches of Chiloé»'s denomination because of their unique form of wooden architecture known as the «Chilota School of Religious Architecture on Wood».

Gallery

See also
 List of Jesuit sites

References 

Wooden churches in Chile
Churches in Chiloé Archipelago
World Heritage Sites in Chile
Colonial architecture in Chile
Roman Catholic churches completed in 1740
Jesuit churches
18th-century Roman Catholic church buildings in Chile